The Haapamäki–Seinäjoki railway is a railway running between the Haapamäki railway station and the Seinäjoki railway station in Finland. It is part of the historical Tampere–Vaasa railway; its other segments as known today include Tampere–Haapamäki and Seinäjoki–Vaasa.

Overview 
It consists of one track for its entire length, and is unelectrified.

History 

The construction of the Tampere–Vaasa railway became relevant towards the end of the 1870s. In 1877-1878, the line was confirmed, and the formal decision to build the line was made during the concurrent session of the Diet of Finland. The construction was initiated in 1879; the section between Vaasa and Alavus was opened for provisional traffic on 10 November 1882, and the Tampere–Alavus segment followed on November 22. In September 1883, the railway was formally inaugurated and transferred under the ownership of the Railway Administration.

Services 
VR Group operates two daily regional train services in each direction on the route Jyväskylä–Seinäjoki, as well as two additional services per direction between Seinäjoki and Ähtäri. On the Haapamäki–Seinäjoki line, these services call in Pihlajavesi, Myllymäki, Eläinpuisto-Zoo, Ähtäri, Tuuri and Alavus.

References

External links 
 

Railway lines in Finland
5 ft gauge railways in Finland
Railway lines opened in 1882